Acanthodactylus harranensis, commonly called the Harran fringe-toed lizard, is a species of lizard in the family Lacertidae. The species is endemic to South-East Anatolia.

Geographic range
A. harranensis is native to Turkey, and is known only from the ruins of the ancient city of Harran. It may also occur in Syria and Iraq.

Description
A. harranensis is a relatively large and stout-bodied Acanthodactylus, with a tail more than 1.5 times body length, and a dorsal pattern consisting of irregular longitudinal dark and light stripes or a series of spots in juveniles.

Habitat
The natural habitat of A. harranensis is in rocky areas.

Reproduction
A. harranensis is oviparous.

Conservation status
The species A. harranensis is threatened by tourism, overgrazing, and agriculture.

References

Bibliography
Baran I, Kumlutas Y, Lanza B, Sindaco R, Ilgaz Ç, Avci A, Crucitti P (2005). Acanthodactylus harranensis, A New Species of Lizard from Southeastern Turkey (Reptilia: Sauria: Lacertidae). Bolletino Museo Regionale di Scienze Naturali, Torino 23 (1): 323–341. 

Lizards of Asia
Reptiles of Turkey
Endemic fauna of Turkey
Reptiles described in 2005
Taxa named by Ībrahim Baran
Taxa named by Benedetto Lanza